Sutherlands Creek  is a rural locality in Victoria, Australia.

Sutherlands Creek Post Office opened on 15 February 1860 and closed in 1960.

References

Towns in Victoria (Australia)
Golden Plains Shire